Diacme is a genus of moths of the family Crambidae.

Species
Diacme adipaloides (Grote & Robinson, 1867)
Diacme claudialis 
Diacme elealis (Walker, 1859)
Diacme finitalis (Guenée, 1854)
Diacme griseicincta (Hampson, 1913)
Diacme liparalis (Guenée, 1854)
Diacme mopsalis (Walker, 1859)
Diacme oriolalis (Guenée, 1854)
Diacme phyllisalis (Walker, 1859)
Diacme samealis (Snellen, 1875)

References

Spilomelinae
Crambidae genera
Taxa named by William Warren (entomologist)